Autumn Quail is a novel by the Egyptian writer Naguib Mahfouz. It is considered to be one of his more philosophical works. The novel looks at foreignness, the past, and the everchanging reality through the character Isa Al-Dabbagh. The novel was adapted into a film in 1967, and the film was directed by Hussam Addein Mustafa. The novel was translated into English in 1985 under the title Autumn Quail.

Summary 
The story opens on Black Saturday. The main character, Isa, is a government employee and a member of the Wafd party. After being close to getting promoted to a much higher position and marrying ((Salwa)), the daughter of a Pasha, the revolution uprises and changes his life; he gets fired and his engagement gets broken off, leaving him crippled. He goes to Alexandria where he meets the prostitute ((Riri)), who lives with him before he kicks her out upon finding out that she is pregnant. Then, he marries a rich infertile divorcee. Throughout the novel, he suffers from boredom and depression, and he finds solace in gambling. After a while, he runs into ((Riri)) and with her a young girl, his daughter. In the end, he sits in the dark next to Saad Zaghloul’s statue before a strong young man holding a flower comes to talk to him and leaves. Isa follows the footsteps of the young man leaving behind him his loneliness and darkness.

Criticism 
The hero is “in a state of personal alienation and conflict between what is happening and what has happened to him in the past.” The scholar Mahmoud Amin compares this novel and Mahfouz's previous novel (The Thief and The Dogs), saying that the latter represents the consciousness of a rebel attempting to change a rigid reality, whereas ‘Autumn Quail’ represents a changing reality clashing with a rigid consciousness. He also thinks that the novel published after ‘Autumn Quail’, ‘The Search’, is a continuation of and elaboration on some of the aspects of ‘Autumn Quail’. Additionally, he states that the title of the novel refers to the materialistic and moral immigration of the protagonist in his attempt at finding warmth.

Complete Works

Novels 
 Three Novels of Ancient Egypt:  Khufu's Wisdom (1939), Rhadopis of Nubia (1943), The Struggle of Thebes (1944).   
 Cairo Trilogy: Palace Walk (1956), Palace of Desire (1957), Sugar Street (1957).   
 Cairo Modern (1945)  
 Khan Al-Khalili (1945)  
 Midaq Alley (1947)  
 The Mirage (1948)  
 The Beginning and The End (1949)  
 Children of Gebelawi (1959)  
 The Thief and The Dogs (1961)  
 Autumn Quail (1962)  
 Zaabalawi (1963)  
 The Search (1964)  
 The Beggar (1965)  
 Adrift on the Nile (1966)  
 Miramar (1967)  
 Mirrors (1972)  
 Love in the Rain (1973)  
 Karnak Café (1974)  
 Stories from Our Neighbourhood (1975)  
 Heart of The Night (1975)  
 Respected Sir (1975)  
 The Harafish (1977)  
 Arabian Nights and Days (1979)  
 Love and the Veil (1980)  
 Wedding Song (1981)  
 The Final Hour (1982)  
 The Journey of Ibn Fattouma (1983)  
 Akhenaten, Dweller in Truth (1985)  
 The Day the Leader was Killed (1985)  
 Morning and Evening Talk (1987)  
 The Coffee House (1988)

Short Stories 
 Whisper of Madness (1938) 
 God's World (1962) 
 Notorious House (1965) 
 Beneath the Umbrella (1967) 
 The Pub of the Black Cat (1969) 
 A Story Without a Beginning or an Ending (1971) 
 The Honeymoon (1971) 
 The Crime (1973) 
 Love above the Pyramid Plateau (1979) 
 The Devil Preaches (1979) 
 I See What The Sleeper Sees (1982) 
 Secret Organizing (1984) 
 Morning of Roses (1987) 
 The False Dawn (1988) 
 The Final Decision (1996) 
 Echoes of Forgetting (1999) 
 The Sympathetic Youth (2001)

Other Written Works 
 A translation into Arabic of James Baikie's Ancient Egypt (1932)  
 Echoes of an Autobiography (1994)  
 Before the Throne (2009)  
 Dreams of the Rehabilitation Period (2004)

Film Adaptations 
 Al-Ikhtiyar (The Choice) 
 Al-Tut Wal Nubut (The Stick and The Berries) 
 Al-Juuʿ (The Hunger) 
 Al-Ḥub Taḥtal Maṭar (Love in The Rain) 
 Al-Ḥub Fawqa Haḍabatal Haram (Love above the Pyramid Plateau) 
 Al-Ḥarafish 
 Al-Ḥal Ismuhu Naẓira (The Solution's Nazira) 
 Al-Khadima (The Maid) 
 Al-Sarāb (The Mirage) 
 Al-Sukkariya (Sugar Street) 
 Al-Samman Wal Kharif (Quail and Autumn) 
 The Beggar (Al-Shaḥat) 
 Al-Sharida (The Fugitive) 
 Al-Ṭariq (The Search) 
 Al-Ṭariq Al-Masdud (Blocked Road) 
 Al-Futtuwa (The Youth) 
 Cairo 30 
 Al-Karnak (Karnak Café) 
 Al-Liṣu Wal Kilab (The Thief and The Dogs) 
 Allahu Akbar (God is Great) 
 Al-Muttaham (The Accused) 
 Al-Mujrem (The Criminal) 
 Al-Muḏnibun (The Guilty) 
 Al-Masṭul Wal Qunbula (The Intoxicated and The Bomb) 
 Al-Muṭarad (The Chased) 
 Al-Muntaqim (The Avenger) 
 Al-Nasir Salaḥuddin 
 Al-Nimrud (The Nimrud) 
 Al-Hariba (The Runaway) 
 Al-Waḥsh (The Monster) 
 Eḥna Talamiḏa (We Are Students) 
 Imbraṭuriyet Mim (M's Empire) 
 Asʿad Allahu Masa’uka (Have a Good Evening) 
 Aṣdiqā’u Al-Shayṭan (The Devil's Mates) 
 Amiratu Ḥubbi Ana (My Love's Princess) 
 Ana Ḥurra (I Am Free) 
 Ahlu Al-Qimma (The Peak's People) 
 Ayuub 
 Bidaya Wa Nihaya (The Beginning and The Ending) 
 Bayn Al-Sama'I Wal Arḍ (Between The Sky and The Land) 
 Bayn Al-Qasrayn (Palace Walk) 
 Bi’r Al-Ḥirmān (The Well of Deprivation) 
 Taḥqiq (Investigation) 
 Tawḥidahu (Monotheism) 
 Tharthara Fawqal Nile (Adrift on The Nile) 
 3 Qiṣaṣ (3 Stories) 
 Thamanul Ḥurriya (The Price of Freedom) 
 Jaʿaluni Mujriman (They Made Me a Criminal) 
 Jamila  
 Khan Khalili 
 Khuṭa Baʿidatal Mada (Long-term Plan) 
 Khayal Al-ʿ Āshiq (The Lover's Imagination) 
 Darb Al-Mahabil (Way of Idiots) 
 Dalal Al-Maṣriiya (The Egyptian Dalal) 
 Ḏātal Wajhayn (The Two-Faced) 
 Ruba Wa Sukayna (Ruba and Sukayna) 
 Zuqaqul Madaq (Midaq Alley) 
 Saḥir Al-Nisaa' (The Women's Enchanter) 
 Samara Al-Amir 
 Shahd Al-Malika (Shahd The Queen) 
 Shay’un Min Al-ʿAḏāb (A Taste of Torture) 
 Ṣaḥib Al-Ṣura (The Picture's Owner) 
 Ṣuwar Mamnuʿa (Forbidden Pictures) 
 ʿAṣrul Ḥub (Love and the Veil) 
 Fatawat el Ḥusseinia (Al-Ḥusseinia's Prescripts) 
 Fatawat Bulaq (Bulaq's Prescripts) 
 Qahir Al-Ẓalam (The Darkness Defeater) 
 Qasrul Shawq (Palace of Desire) 
 Qiṭaṭ Baladi (My Country's Cats) 
 Qalbul Layl (Heart of The Night) 
 Laka Yawmun Ya Ẓalim (A Day For You, Tyrant) 
 Lamḥul Baṣar (In A Flash) 
 Layl Wa Khawana (Night and Traitors)
 Mujrimin Fi Ijaza (A Criminal on Holiday) 
 Min Faḍlaka Wa Iḥsanak (From Your Kindness and Benevolence) 
 Miramar  
 Nisaa’ Al-Jaza'ir (Algerian Women) 
 Nuur Al-ʿUyun (Light of My Eyes) 
 Waṣmatu ʿĀr (A Stigma) 
 Wakalatul Balaḥ (Date Dealership)

TV Series 
 Al-Aqdār (The Fates)  
 Al-Bāqi Min Al-Zamani Sāʿatun (The Final Hour)  
 Al-Jarima (The Crime)  
 Al-Dunya Al-Jadida (The New World)  
 Al-Rajalu Allaḏi Faqada Ḏakaratuhu Marratayn (The Man Who Lost His Memory Twice)  
 Al-Samman Wal Kharif (Quail and Autumn)  
 Al-Ḥarafish (Season 1)  
 Al-Ḥarafish (Season 2)  
 Al-Qarar Al-Akhir (The Final Decision)  
 Al-Liṣu Wal Kilab (The Thief and The Dogs)  
 Al-Maʿmura (The Earth)  
 Afraḥul Qubba (Wedding Song)  
 Meshir  
 Baynal Qasrayn (Palace Walk)  
 Ḥadith Al-Ṣabāḥ Wal Masaa’ (Morning and Evening Talk)  
 Ḥaḍratal Muḥtaram (Respected Sir)  
 Ḥilm Niṣf Al-Shahar (Midnight's Dream)  
 Ḥawadith Muthira (Thrilling Incidents)  
 Khan Khalili  
 (Ṣabaḥul Ward) Morning of Roses  
 ʿAṣr Al-Ḥub (Love and the Veil)  
 Fi Qalbul Layl (In The Heart of the Night)  
 Esmiti Wa Naṣibi (My Destiny)  
 Qashtamar (The Coffee House)  
 Qasrul Shawq (Palace of Desire)  
 Nuur Al-Qamar (Moonlight)  
 Baynal Sama Wal Arḍ (Between The Sky and The Land)

Plays 
 Al-Ḥala Al-ʿĀdiya (Status Quo)  
 Al-Liṣu Wal Kilab (The Thief and The Dogs)  
 Al-Najat (Survival)  
 Bidayatun Wa Nihaya (The Beginning and The Ending)  
 Baynal Qasrayn (Palace Walk)  
 Ḥiakayāt Ḥaritna (Stories from Our Neighbourhood)  
 Khan Khalili  
 Zuqaqul Madaq (Midaq Alley)  
 Esmiti Wa Naṣibi (My Destiny)  
 Qahwatul Tuta (The Tuta Café)  
 Miramar

Other Dramatic Works 
 Al-Jarasu Yarin (The Bell Rings) 
 Al-Ḥub Fawqa Haḍabatal Haram (Love above the Pyramid Plateau) 
 Al-Ḥaflul Akhir (The Last Party) 
 Al-Khawf (The Fear) 
 Al-Sarāb (The Mirage) 
 Al-Shar Maʿbud (Sacred Evil) 
 Al-Shaykh Muḥarram  
 Al-Ghurfa Raqam 12 (Room 12) 
 Al-Miʿṭaf (The Coat) 
 Al-Nashwa Fi November (Ecstasy in November) 
 Awlad Ḥaritna (Children of Gebelawi) 
 Ayyam Al-Ḥub Wal Junun (Days of Love and Ecstasy) 
 Baytun Sayi’ Al-Sumʿa (Notorious House) 
 Zala Al-Shar (Eradication of Evil) 
 Zakariya  
 Zuhurun La Taḏbal (Unwilting Flowers) 
 Saḥibatul ʿIṣma (Inviolabile Woman) 
 ʿAṣr Al-Ḥub (Love and the Veil) 
 Qablal Raḥil (Before Leaving) 
 Qashtamar (The Coffee House) 
 Qasrul Shawq (Palace of Desire) 
 Miramar

External links 

 "Quail and Autumn"...Swarms of pretenders are falling apart

References 

Novels by Naguib Mahfouz
1962 novels